Alchemical Playschool is a 2006 album by The Legendary Pink Dots.

Track listing
 "Part One"
 "Part Two"
 "Part Three"
 "Part Four"

Notes
Limited to 400 copies packaged in a cloth bag inside a soap stone box with trident symbol etched into the stone. Also available as a  2x10" box and a regular CD.

Personnel
Edward Ka-Spel – voice, keyboards
The Silverman – keyboards, electronics
Martijn De Kleer – guitar, bass, drums
Niels van Hoorn – saxophone, flute
Raymond Steeg – production, mastering

References
Regen Magazine review

2006 albums
The Legendary Pink Dots albums